Georgi Markov (born April 5, 1946) is a retired Bulgarian  Greco-Roman wrestler.

He was born in 1946, in Gorno Vyrshilo, Pazardzhik province.

Markov was a European Champion and a World Champion, but is probably best-known for winning a gold medal at the 1972 Summer Olympics.

At the 1984 European Championships, in Jönköping, Markov disabled an intruder with a gun who attempted to disrupt the games.

He was awarded the degree of Doctor Honoris Causa.

References

External links
profile

1946 births
Living people
Olympic wrestlers of Bulgaria
Wrestlers at the 1972 Summer Olympics
Bulgarian male sport wrestlers
Olympic gold medalists for Bulgaria
Olympic medalists in wrestling
People from Pazardzhik Province
Medalists at the 1972 Summer Olympics
20th-century Bulgarian people
21st-century Bulgarian people